ONI is a start-up company based in Oxford manufacturing super-resolution microscopes.

Background
ONI is a spin-out from Oxford University, originally incorporated in February 2016 and began trading in May 2016.

In May 2016 ONI announced it has raised £1.2 million in seed funding to develop the microscope and launch the product to market. The first product released was the Nanoimager

In April 2017, ONI  raised another £3 million.

In July 2018, ONI  raised a $25 million Series A funding round.

In October 2018, the Institute of Physics (IOP) awarded the Business Start-up Award 2018 to ONI

In November 2018, Fast Track included ONI in the Disruptors to Watch list.

References

Companies based in Oxford
British companies established in 2016